William Gustavus Whiteley (August 7, 1819 – April 23, 1886) was an American lawyer and politician from Wilmington, in New Castle County, Delaware. He was a member of the Democratic Party, who served in the Delaware General Assembly and as U.S. Representative from Delaware, Mayor of Wilmington, and Associate Judge of the Superior Court of Delaware.

Early life and family
Whiteley was born near Newark, Delaware, to Henry and Catherine Whiteley.

William attended Bullock's School at Wilmington and graduated from Princeton College in 1838. He studied law under James A. Bayard Jr., was admitted to the Delaware Bar in 1841, and began a practice in Wilmington.

Professional and political career
He was the prothonotary of New Castle County from 1852 to 1856, and was elected as a Democrat to the 35th and 36th Congresses, serving from March 4, 1857 to March 3, 1861. While in Congress he was chairman of the Committee on Agriculture in the 35th Congress. He was not a candidate for renomination in 1860 and resumed his occupation as prothonotary of New Castle County from 1862 to 1867.

Whiteley was mayor of Wilmington from 1875 to 1878 and was a member of a commission to settle fishery disputes between New Jersey and Delaware in 1877. He was census enumerator for Delaware in 1880, and was appointed as associate judge of the Superior Court of Delaware from March 31, 1884 until his death.

Death and legacy
Whiteley died at Wilmington and is buried in the Old Broad Street Presbyterian Church Cemetery at Bridgeton, New Jersey.

Almanac
Elections are held the first Tuesday after November 1. U.S. Representatives took office March 4 and have a two-year term.

References

Places with more information
Delaware Historical Society; website; 505 North Market Street, Wilmington, Delaware 19801; (302) 655-7161
University of Delaware; Library website; 181 South College Avenue, Newark, Delaware 19717; (302) 831-2965

Notes

External links
Biographical Directory of the United States Congress 
Delaware’s Members of Congress 

The Political Graveyard

1819 births
1886 deaths
People from Newark, Delaware
Princeton University alumni
Mayors of Wilmington, Delaware
Associate Judges of Delaware
Burials in New Jersey
Democratic Party members of the United States House of Representatives from Delaware
19th-century American politicians
19th-century American judges